The internal energy of a thermodynamic system is the energy contained within it, measured as the quantity of energy necessary to bring the system from its  standard internal state to its present internal state of interest, accounting for the gains and losses of energy due to changes in its internal state, including such quantities as magnetization. It excludes the kinetic energy of motion and the potential energy of position of the system as a whole, with respect to its surroundings and external force fields, but it includes the thermal energy (i.e. internal kinetic energy). The internal energy of an isolated system cannot change, as expressed in the law of conservation of energy, a foundation of the first law of thermodynamics.

The internal energy cannot be measured absolutely. Thermodynamics concerns changes in the internal energy, not its absolute value. The processes that change the internal energy are transfers, into or out of the system, of matter, or of energy, as heat, or by thermodynamic work.  These processes are measured by changes in the system's properties, such as temperature, entropy, volume, electric polarization, and molar constitution. The internal energy depends only on the internal state of the system and not on the particular choice from many possible processes by which energy may pass into or out of the system. It is a state variable, a thermodynamic potential, and an extensive property.

Thermodynamics defines internal energy macroscopically, for the body as a whole. In statistical mechanics, the internal energy of a body can be analyzed microscopically in terms of the kinetic energies of microscopic motion of the system's particles from translations, rotations, and vibrations, and of the potential energies associated with microscopic forces, including chemical bonds.

The unit of energy in the International System of Units (SI) is the joule (J). The internal energy relative to the mass with unit J/kg is the specific internal energy. The corresponding quantity relative to the amount of substance with unit J/mol is the molar internal energy.

Cardinal functions
The internal energy of a system depends on its entropy S, its volume V and its number of massive particles: . It expresses the thermodynamics of a system in the energy representation. As a function of state, its arguments are exclusively extensive variables of state. Alongside the internal energy, the other cardinal function of state of a thermodynamic system is its entropy, as a function, of the same list of extensive variables of state, except that the entropy, is replaced in the list by the internal energy, . It expresses the entropy representation.

Each cardinal function is a monotonic function of each of its natural or canonical variables. Each provides its characteristic or fundamental equation, for example , that by itself contains all thermodynamic information about the system.

In contrast, Legendre transforms are necessary to derive fundamental equations for other thermodynamic potentials and Massieu functions. The entropy as a function only of extensive state variables is the one and only cardinal function of state for the generation of Massieu functions. It is not itself customarily designated a 'Massieu function', though rationally it might be thought of as such, corresponding to the term 'thermodynamic potential', which includes the internal energy.

For real and practical systems, explicit expressions of the fundamental equations are almost always unavailable, but the functional relations exist in principle. Formal, in principle, manipulations of them are valuable for the understanding of thermodynamics.

Description and definition
The internal energy  of a given state of the system is determined relative to that of a standard state of the system, by adding up the macroscopic transfers of energy that accompany a change of state from the reference state to the given state:
 
where  denotes the difference between the internal energy of the given state and that of the reference state,
It is the energy needed to create the given state of the system from the reference state. From a non-relativistic microscopic point of view, it may be divided into microscopic potential energy, and microscopic kinetic energy, components:
 

The microscopic kinetic energy of a system arises as the sum of the motions of all the system's particles with respect to the center-of-mass frame, whether it be the motion of atoms, molecules, atomic nuclei, electrons, or other particles. The microscopic potential energy algebraic summative components are those of the chemical and nuclear particle bonds, and the physical force fields within the system, such as due to internal induced electric or magnetic dipole moment, as well as the energy of deformation of solids (stress-strain). Usually, the split into microscopic kinetic and potential energies is outside the scope of macroscopic thermodynamics.

Internal energy does not include the energy due to motion or location of a system as a whole. That is to say, it excludes any kinetic or potential energy the body may have because of its motion or location in external gravitational, electrostatic, or electromagnetic fields. It does, however, include the contribution of such a field to the energy due to the coupling of the internal degrees of freedom of the object with the field. In such a case, the field is included in the thermodynamic description of the object in the form of an additional external parameter.

For practical considerations in thermodynamics or engineering, it is rarely necessary, convenient, nor even possible, to consider all energies belonging to the total intrinsic energy of a sample system, such as the energy given by the equivalence of mass. Typically, descriptions only include components relevant to the system under study.  Indeed, in most systems under consideration, especially through thermodynamics, it is impossible to calculate the total internal energy. Therefore, a convenient null reference point may be chosen for the internal energy.

The internal energy is an extensive property: it depends on the size of the system, or on the amount of substance it contains.

At any temperature greater than absolute zero, microscopic potential energy and kinetic energy are constantly converted into one another, but the sum remains constant in an isolated system (cf. table). In the classical picture of thermodynamics, kinetic energy vanishes at zero temperature and the internal energy is purely potential energy. However, quantum mechanics has demonstrated that even at zero temperature particles maintain a residual energy of motion, the zero point energy. A system at absolute zero is merely in its quantum-mechanical ground state, the lowest energy state available. At absolute zero a system of given composition has attained its minimum attainable entropy.

The microscopic kinetic energy portion of the internal energy gives rise to the temperature of the system. Statistical mechanics relates the pseudo-random kinetic energy of individual particles to the mean kinetic energy of the entire ensemble of particles comprising a system. Furthermore, it relates the mean microscopic kinetic energy to the macroscopically observed empirical property that is expressed as temperature of the system. While temperature is an intensive measure, this energy expresses the concept as an extensive property of the system, often referred to as the thermal energy, The scaling property between temperature and thermal energy is the entropy change of the system.
 
Statistical mechanics considers any system to be statistically distributed across an ensemble of  microstates. In a system that is in thermodynamic contact equilibrium with a heat reservoir, each microstate has an energy  and is associated with a probability . The internal energy is the mean value of the system's total energy, i.e., the sum of all microstate energies, each weighted by its probability of occurrence:
 
This is the statistical expression of the law of conservation of energy.

Internal energy changes
Thermodynamics is chiefly concerned with the changes in internal energy .

For a closed system, with matter transfer excluded, the changes in internal energy are due to heat transfer  and due to thermodynamic work  done by the system on its surroundings.  Accordingly, the internal energy change  for a process may be written

When a closed system receives energy as heat, this energy increases the internal energy. It is distributed between microscopic kinetic and microscopic potential energies. In general, thermodynamics does not trace this distribution.  In an ideal gas all of the extra energy results in a temperature increase, as it is stored solely as microscopic kinetic energy; such heating is said to be sensible.

A second kind of mechanism of change in the internal energy of a closed system changed is in its doing of work on its surroundings. Such work may be simply mechanical, as when the system expands to drive a piston, or, for example, when the system changes its electric polarization so as to drive a change in the electric field in the surroundings.

If the system is not closed, the third mechanism that can increase the internal energy is transfer of matter into the system. This increase,  cannot be split into heat and work components. If the system is so set up physically that heat transfer and work that it does are by pathways separate from and independent of matter transfer, then the transfers of energy add to change the internal energy:

If a system undergoes certain phase transformations while being heated, such as melting and vaporization, it may be observed that the temperature of the system does not change until the entire sample has completed the transformation. The energy introduced into the system while the temperature does not change is called latent energy or latent heat, in contrast to sensible heat, which is associated with temperature change.

Internal energy of the ideal gas
Thermodynamics often uses the concept of the ideal gas for teaching purposes, and as an approximation for working systems. The ideal gas consists of particles considered as point objects that interact only by elastic collisions and fill a volume such that their mean free path between collisions is much larger than their diameter. Such systems approximate monatomic gases such as helium and other noble gases. For an ideal gas the kinetic energy consists only of the translational energy of the individual atoms. Monatomic particles do not possess rotational or vibrational degrees of freedom, and are not electronically excited to higher energies except at very high temperatures.

Therefore, the internal energy of an ideal gas depends solely on its temperature (and the number of gas particles): . It is not dependent on other thermodynamic quantities such as pressure or density.

The internal energy of an ideal gas is proportional to its mass (number of moles)  and to its temperature 
 

where   is the isochoric (at constant volume) molar heat capacity of the gas.  is constant for an ideal gas. In case of the ideal gas it is in the following way 

 

where  is an arbitrary positive constant and where  is the universal gas constant. It is easily seen that  is a linearly homogeneous function of the three variables (that is, it is extensive in these variables), and that it is weakly convex. Knowing temperature and pressure to be the derivatives 
  the ideal gas law  immediately follows as below:

Internal energy of a closed thermodynamic system
The above summation of all components of change in internal energy assumes that a positive energy denotes heat added to the system or the negative of work done by the system on its surroundings.

This relationship may be expressed in infinitesimal terms using the differentials of each term, though only the internal energy is an exact differential. For a closed system, with transfers only as heat and work, the change in the internal energy is
 
expressing the first law of thermodynamics. It may be expressed in terms of other thermodynamic parameters. Each term is composed of an intensive variable (a generalized force) and its conjugate infinitesimal extensive variable (a generalized displacement).

For example, the mechanical work done by the system may be related to the pressure  and volume change . The pressure is the intensive generalized force, while the volume change is the extensive generalized displacement:
 
This defines the direction of work, to be energy transfer from the working system to the surroundings, indicated by a positive term. Taking the direction of heat transfer  to be into the working fluid and assuming a reversible process, the heat is
 
where  denotes the temperature, and  denotes the entropy.

The change in internal energy becomes

Changes due to temperature and volume
The expression relating changes in internal energy to changes in temperature and volume is

This is useful if the equation of state is known.

In case of an ideal gas, we can derive that , i.e. the internal energy of an ideal gas can be written as a function that depends only on the temperature.

The expression relating changes in internal energy to changes in temperature and volume is

The equation of state is the ideal gas law

Solve for pressure:

Substitute in to internal energy expression:

Take the derivative of pressure with respect to temperature:

Replace:

And simplify:

is substituted in the fundamental thermodynamic relation

This gives

The term  is the heat capacity at constant volume 

From the fundamental thermodynamic relation, it follows that the differential of the Helmholtz free energy  is given by

This gives the expression above.

Changes due to temperature and pressure
When considering fluids or solids, an expression in terms of the temperature and pressure is usually more useful:

where it is assumed that the heat capacity at constant pressure is related to the heat capacity at constant volume according to

The partial derivative of the pressure with respect to temperature at constant volume can be expressed in terms of the coefficient of thermal expansion 

and the isothermal compressibility

by writing

and equating dV to zero and solving for the ratio dP/dT. This gives

Changes due to volume at constant temperature
The internal pressure is defined as a partial derivative of the internal energy with respect to the volume at constant temperature:

Internal energy of multi-component systems

In addition to including the entropy  and volume  terms in the internal energy, a system is often described also in terms of the number of particles or chemical species it contains:

where  are the molar amounts of constituents of type  in the system.
 
where  is a factor describing the growth of the system. The differential internal energy may be written as

 
 

and where the coefficients  are the chemical potentials for the components of type  in the system. The chemical potentials are defined as the partial derivatives of the internal energy with respect to the variations in composition:

As conjugate variables to the composition , the chemical potentials are intensive properties, intrinsically characteristic of the qualitative nature of the system, and not proportional to its extent.

The sum over the composition of the system is the Gibbs free energy:

that arises from changing the composition of the system at constant temperature and pressure.

Internal energy in an elastic medium
For an elastic medium the mechanical energy term of the internal energy is expressed in terms of the stress  and strain  involved in elastic processes. In Einstein notation for tensors, with summation over repeated indices, for unit volume, the infinitesimal statement is

 

Euler's theorem yields for the internal energy:

 

For a linearly elastic material, the stress is related to the strain by

 

Elastic deformations, such as sound, passing through a body, or other forms of macroscopic internal agitation or turbulent motion create states when the system is not in thermodynamic equilibrium. While such energies of motion continue, they contribute to the total energy of the system; thermodynamic internal energy pertains only when such motions have ceased.

History
James Joule studied the relationship between heat, work, and temperature. He observed that friction in a liquid, such as caused by its agitation with work by a paddle wheel, caused an increase in its temperature, which he described as producing a quantity of heat. Expressed in modern units, he found that c. 4186 joules of energy were needed to raise the temperature of one kilogram of water by one degree Celsius.

Notes

See also
Calorimetry
Enthalpy
Exergy
Thermodynamic equations
Thermodynamic potentials
Gibbs free energy
Helmholtz free energy

References

Bibliography of cited references
 Adkins, C. J. (1968/1975). Equilibrium Thermodynamics, second edition, McGraw-Hill, London, .
 Bailyn, M. (1994). A Survey of Thermodynamics, American Institute of Physics Press, New York, .
 Born, M. (1949). Natural Philosophy of Cause and Chance, Oxford University Press, London.
 Callen, H. B. (1960/1985), Thermodynamics and an Introduction to Thermostatistics, (first edition 1960), second edition 1985, John Wiley & Sons, New York, .
 Crawford, F. H. (1963). Heat, Thermodynamics, and Statistical Physics, Rupert Hart-Davis, London, Harcourt, Brace & World, Inc.
 Haase, R. (1971). Survey of Fundamental Laws, chapter 1 of Thermodynamics, pages 1–97 of volume 1, ed. W. Jost, of Physical Chemistry. An Advanced Treatise, ed. H. Eyring, D. Henderson, W. Jost, Academic Press, New York, lcn 73–117081.
 .
 
 Münster, A. (1970), Classical Thermodynamics, translated by E. S. Halberstadt, Wiley–Interscience, London, .
 Planck, M., (1923/1927). Treatise on Thermodynamics, translated by A. Ogg, third English edition, Longmans, Green and Co., London.
 Tschoegl, N. W. (2000). Fundamentals of Equilibrium and Steady-State Thermodynamics, Elsevier, Amsterdam, .

Bibliography
 
 

Physical quantities
Thermodynamic properties
State functions
Statistical mechanics
Energy (physics)